Tongan Ninja is a 2002 kung-fu action comedy film directed by Jason Stutter and filmed in New Zealand. The film garnered notoriety at the time for co-starring and being co-written by Jemaine Clement, star of the HBO comedy Flight of the Conchords.  The movie is a parody of English-dubbed martial arts films, with a plot heavily based on Way of the Dragon.  It also features songs written by Jemaine Clement and Flight of the Conchords co-star Bret McKenzie.

Plot 
A young child is stranded in Tonga when his plane crashes and his father is eaten by piranhas. There, he trains in a dojo until he earns the name Tongan Ninja. The Tongan Ninja is dispatched to the island nation of New Zealand in order to help the brother of his master with his floundering Chinese restaurant.  But the mysterious Mister Big stands in the eatery's way as he sends numerous villains such as Knife Man, Gun Man, and Action Fighter to keep the restaurant closed and the employees in fear. The Tongan Ninja must travel to Mr. Big's ninja headquarters at the So-Called-Syndicate to put a stop to his criminal empire once and for all.

Cast
Sam Manu as Tongan Ninja (Sione Finau) 
Jemaine Clement as Action Fighter (Marvin) 
Linda Tseng as Miss Lee 
Raybon Kan as Asian Sidekick 
David Fane as Herman the Henchman 
Victor Rodger as Mr. Big 
Charley Murphy Samau as Tongan Ninja Child 
Brett Ormsby as Chang the waiter 
Marty Pine as Wong 
Tana Umaga as Famous rugby player

DVD 
The special features section includes a "making of" segment including director's commentary, and cameos by famous New Zealand directors Peter Jackson and Andrew Adamson.

External links 
 

2002 films
Kung fu films
Ninja films
2000s action comedy films
Martial arts comedy films
New Zealand action comedy films
Films set in New Zealand
Films set in Tonga
2000s parody films
Fictional Tongan people
2002 comedy films
Japan in non-Japanese culture
2000s English-language films